Dangerous Encounters of the First Kind is a 1980 Hong Kong crime film directed by Tsui Hark. The initial cut of the film was banned for its violence, generating public interest in the film that caused its edited version to become a box office success in Hong Kong.

Plot
Paul manufactures a bomb using a wristwatch for its timer and he and his two friends Lung and Ko set it off in a movie theater for fun, avoiding any casualties. Wan-Chu, a girl who spends her time torturing animals, sees them flee the theater and follows them but does not tell the police. After being fired from her job at a printing press for pouring ink on a coworker during an argument, she argues with her older brother Tan, the police officer assigned to investigate the bombing, and impales a cat on a fence post out of anger. She then forces her way into the group of boys by threatening to expose them to the police if they do not become her friends. She makes them discard a mouse she has tortured and in return they challenge her to place a bomb in a public restroom, which she does without hesitation.

When the three boys try to ditch her, Wan-Chu plants a bomb of her own, warning them that the next one will be on their front door so that the police will search their house. Now in control of the group, she forces them to assist her in hijacking a bus full of tourists from an airport, but the bus door closes with only Wan-Chu on it. Threatening to light a bomb she is holding, she forces the guide and the tourists to strip to their underwear, then abandons them at a construction site. She finds the three boys leaving their school and pours gasoline on them. She attempts to burn them but they use one of the burning shirts against her as she flees and is nearly hit by a car, causing an argument with its foreign driver. The boys throw rocks at the car and the man chases them as Wan-Chu steals a package from his car filled with Japanese money orders and accidentally drops a written contract in an alley without noticing. The foreigner, a gun runner named Bruce, is killed with a sword by his boss Nigel for becoming exposed.

Paul attempts to exchange one of the money orders at a bank but when the teller takes it to the director Paul gets scared and leaves. The youths threaten an exchange manager, demanding information on how to exchange the money orders, but he gives them a fake address. Now angered, they plant a bomb under his car but only kill his bodyguard, the former Mr. Hong Kong. Based on the survivor's testimony, the police link the attack to Paul's previous attempt to exchange the money order at the bank.

Wan-Chu offers a deal to a local gang that previously harassed her and meets their leader, Uncle Hark, who works as a club DJ. Hark takes Wan-Chu and Ko to a banker who agrees to exchange 20 of the money orders into Hong Kong dollars for 30% of their amount, then Hark sends his gang to rob the two youths of the money. Wan-Chu and Ko throw the money down the stairwell to Lung, who gets trapped by the gang members in the parking garage. Lung throws the money and money orders at them and escapes when Paul, Ko and Wan-Chu throw bombs at the gang members. Wan-Chu is furious at Lung for throwing the money away and their argument leads the boys to abandon her again.

Now alone, Wan-Chu is caught by Hark and his gang. As they are threatening to burn her, Tan arrives and beats up Hark but Wan-Chu refuses to press charges. Back at their apartment, Tan angrily beats her for fighting with the gang then ties her to the bars on the windows with cable ties.

Back at the club, Hark makes his gang give him the money they picked up in the parking garage. A drunk foreigner sees one of the money orders among the currency and tells Nigel. Nigel's gang tortures Hark with piano wire until he tells them about Wan-Chu. Nigel's gang comes to her apartment but then Tan returns home and leads them on a chase. Nigel attempts to carry Wan-Chu away but when she struggles out of his grasp she falls and gets impaled through her head by a fence post where she earlier killed a cat in the same way. The police arrive and collect bullets lodged in the wall but also find the money orders under the mouse cage in the house, causing the chief to take Tan off the case.

When Paul's face is shown on TV in connection with the bombings, the three boys pack their backpacks and hide out in a large cemetery crowded with gravestones, arguing among themselves. They later attempt to kill themselves by drinking Dettol. Paul and Lung spit it out but Ko swallows it so Paul runs to a shop to buy milk to dilute the poison and is recognized by the seller. Back in the city, Tan attacks two Mormon missionaries on the street after mistaking them for members of Nigel's gang and is brought into the office to be taken off duty for a few days. While there, he answers the telephone and is told by the milk seller that she has seen Paul at the cemetery.

Tan finds Lung running to find a medic for Ko and handcuffs him to a post then chases Paul through the gravestones and catches him. Lung is found by one of Nigel's, who holds him at gunpoint and tells Tan to drop his weapon. Tan shoots the man, who shoots and kills Lung and injures Paul as he falls to his death. Nigel chases Tan down a hill, demanding to know where the contract is, then beats him unconscious. Paul grabs a gun and shoots at a gang member but only ends up shooting Lung more. The gang member hunts him through the cemetery and shoots and kills him in his hiding spot. Ko surprises the man and kills him by bashing his head with a metal pipe, then takes his machine gun and kills Nigel's remaining man. Nigel shoots the car Ko is using to escape then pulls the boy out and beats him. Ko grabs a gun from the ground and shoots Nigel twice but then runs out of bullets. Tan grabs a machine gun from the ground and shoots and kills Nigel. Ko takes the machine gun from Tan and gleefully shoots it into the cemetery as a montage of photographs from the 1967 Hong Kong riots is shown. The film ends with a flashback to one of the boys' more innocent pranks when they dropped a bag of red paint onto a pedestrian.

Cast

Lieh Lo as Tan
Lin Chen-Chi as Wan-Chu
Albert Au as Paul
Lung Tin Sang as Lung
Che Biu Law as Ko
Ray Lui as Inspector Lui
Bruce Baron as Bruce
Chu Shing-Choi as Paul's Mother
Lee Chun-Wa as Former Mr. Hong Kong
Richard Da Silva as Uncle Hark
Nigel Falgate as Nigel
Fung Yun-Chuen as Paul's Father
Deannie Yip as Police Officer
Nick Wai Kei Lam as Money Launderer
Leong Po-Chih as Head of Interpol Unit
John Sham as Interpol Officer
Stephen Shin as Interpol Officer
David Wu as Tour Guide
Ronny Yu as Interpol Officer
Yuen Wai-Hung as Michel
Tsui Hark as Interpol Officer (uncredited)

Production
Tsui Hark hired Lin Chen-Chi after seeing her work in films produced by Shaw Brothers Studio and noticing that her face was catlike. Tsui Hark used live animals for the scenes of animal torture. The score for the film was taken from various sources including Goblin's soundtrack to George Romero's Dawn of the Dead and Jean-Michel Jarre's album Oxygène.

Release and censorship
The film was released in Hong Kong under the English title Dangerous Encounter—1st Kind. It has also been released under the English titles Don't Play with Fire and Playing with Fire.
The Hong Kong censor immediately banned the first version of the film for its violent content and forced a restructuring of the film. In the original version, the teenagers make bombs and leave them in public places, a reference to the 1967 rebellion in Hong Kong. In the revised version, the teenagers are merely introduced as hit-and-run drivers. The original ends with a montage of photographs of the mayhem of 1967. The censored version of the film has a runtime of 95 minutes, while the uncut version has a runtime of 100 minutes, though both versions contain unique material (approx. 17 minutes in the original cut, and approx. 13 minutes in the theatrical cut). The publicity generated by the initial banning of the film generated interest in the film, ensuring large audiences for the censored version that was released in Hong Kong theaters.

The original uncut version has been released on DVD in France by HK Vidéo. On this release, the footage that was originally removed from the theatrical version has been sourced from a VHS tape commissioned by director Tsui Hark during production when he was ordered to make changes to the film. The original film elements for this footage are thought to be lost.

Reception
The film was a success, becoming the 33rd-highest-grossing film at the Hong Kong box office in 1980.

Many reviewers have noted the bleak, nihilistic nature of the film. In 1982, Peter Cowie wrote that the film is going "heavily for the shock-horror mould at present dominating much contemporary drama". In their 2014 book International Noir, Homer B. Petty and R. Barton Palmer cited the work an example of the "challenging works of the Hong Kong Noir Wave".

References

External links
 
 

1980 films
1980s crime films
1980s Cantonese-language films
Films about arms trafficking
Films about animal cruelty
Films about terrorism in Asia
Films directed by Tsui Hark
Hong Kong crime films
1980s Hong Kong films